William Blackwood and Sons was a Scottish publishing house and printer founded by William Blackwood in 1804. It played a key role in literary history, publishing many important authors, for example John Buchan, George Tomkyns Chesney, Joseph Conrad, George Eliot, E. M. Forster, John Galt, John Neal, Thomas De Quincey, Charles Reade, Margaret Oliphant, John Hanning Speke and Anthony Trollope, both in books and in the monthly Blackwood’s Magazine.

History

In 1804 William Blackwood opened a shop in South Bridge Street, Edinburgh, for the sale of old, rare and curious books. He undertook the Scottish agency for John Murray and other London publishers, and gradually drifted into publishing on his own account, moving in 1816 to Princes Street. On 1 April 1817 the first number of the Edinburgh Monthly Magazine was published, which on its seventh number became Blackwood's Edinburgh Magazine. "Maga," as this magazine soon came to be called, was the organ of the Scottish Tory party, and round it gathered a host of able writers.

In May 1824 Blackwood's became the first British literary journal to publish work by an American with an essay by John Neal that got reprinted across Europe. Over the following year and a half the magazine published Neal's "American Writers" series, which is the first written history of American literature. The relationship between Blackwood and Neal fell apart over Neal's novel Brother Jonathan, which Blackwood published at a loss in late 1825.

In 1829 he wrote to his son William in India telling him that he was moving from Princes Street to 45 George Street as George Street was "becoming more and more a place of business and the east end of Princes Street is now like Charring Cross, a mere place for coaches". His brother Thomas bought 43 and in 1830 Thomas Hamilton remodelled the entire frontage of the pair for the Blackwood Brothers or Messrs. Blackwood. Thomas' shop operated as a silk merchant.

William Blackwood died in 1834 and is buried in an ornate vault in the lower western section of Old Calton Cemetery. He was succeeded by his two sons, Alexander and Robert, who added a London branch to the firm. In 1845 Alexander Blackwood died, and shortly afterwards Robert.

A younger brother, John Blackwood succeeded to the business; four years later he was joined by Major William Blackwood, who continued in the firm until his death in 1861. In 1862 the major's elder son, William Blackwood (born 1836), was taken into partnership. On the death of John Blackwood, William Blackwood junior was left in sole control of the business. With him were associated his nephews, George William and JH Blackwood, sons of Major George Blackwood, who was killed at Maiwand in 1880.

The last member of the Blackwood family to run the company was Douglas Blackwood. During World War II Blackwood was a fighter pilot and at the height of the Battle of Britain recalled looking down from 25,000 feet to see the firm's London office in Paternoster Row ablaze. Millions of books were lost in the fire and the destruction of Blackwood's base in the City of London marked the beginning of the firm's decline. He retired in 1976 and by 1980 the firm had amalgamated.

See Annals of a Publishing House; William Blackwood and his Sons ... (1897–1898), the first two volumes of which were written by Mrs Oliphant; the third, dealing with John Blackwood, by his daughter, Mrs Gerald Porter.

Books first published by Blackwood
Edinburgh Encyclopædia (from 1808), editor David Brewster
The Pilgrim of the Sun, (1814) James Hogg
Mador of the Moor, (1816), James Hogg
The Black Dwarf (1816), Walter Scott
Brother Jonathan: or, the New Englanders (1825), John Neal
The Course of Time (1827), Robert Pollok
Ten Thousand a-Year (1841), Samuel Warren
Scenes of Clerical Life (1857), George Eliot 
Scenes of Clerical Life free PDF of Blackwood's 1878 Cabinet Edition (the critical standard with Eliot's final corrections) at the George Eliot Archive
Adam Bede (1859), George Eliot 
Adam Bede free PDF of Blackwood's 1878 Cabinet Edition (the critical standard with Eliot's final corrections) at the George Eliot Archive
The Lifted Veil (1859), George Eliot 
The Lifted Veil free PDF of Blackwood's 1878 Cabinet Edition (the critical standard with Eliot's final corrections) at the George Eliot Archive
The Mill on the Floss (1860), George Eliot 
The Mill on the Floss free PDF of Blackwood's 1878 Cabinet Edition (the critical standard with Eliot's final corrections) at the George Eliot Archive
Silas Marner (1861), George Eliot 
Silas Marner free PDF of Blackwood's 1878 Cabinet Edition (the critical standard with Eliot's final corrections) at the George Eliot Archive
Felix Holt, the Radical (1866), George Eliot 
Felix Holt, the Radical free PDF of Blackwood's 1878 Cabinet Edition (the critical standard with Eliot's final corrections) at the George Eliot Archive
Middlemarch (1871-8172), George Eliot 
Middlemarch free PDF of Blackwood's 1878 Cabinet Edition (the critical standard with Eliot's final corrections) at the George Eliot Archive
Daniel Deronda (1876), George Eliot 
Daniel Deronda free PDF of Blackwood's 1878 Cabinet Edition (the critical standard with Eliot's final corrections) at the George Eliot Archive
Impressions of Theophrastus Such (1879), George Eliot 
Impressions of Theophrastus Such free PDF of Blackwood's 1878 Cabinet Edition (the critical standard with Eliot's final corrections) at the George Eliot Archive
The Fixed Period (1882), Anthony Trollope
Scottish land-names; their origin and meaning (1894), Herbert Maxwell
The Lost Stradivarius (1895), J. Meade Falkner
My Brilliant Career (1901), Miles Franklin
Youth (1902), Joseph Conrad
William Wetmore Story and His Friends (1903), Henry James
Where Angels Fear to Tread (1905), E. M. Forster
Significant Etymology: Or, Roots, Stems, and Branches of the English Language (1908), James Mitchell
Prester John (1910), John Buchan
The Thirty-Nine Steps (1915), John Buchan
The Power-House (1916), John Buchan
The Dual Mandate in British Tropical Africa (1922), Frederick D. Lugard
The Courts of the Morning (1929), John Buchan
The Curve of Time (1961), M. Wylie Blanchet

Book series published by Blackwood
 Ancient Classics for the English Reader
 Foreign Classics for the English Reader
 Periods of European Literature
 Philosophical Classics for the English Reader

Works originally published in Blackwood's Magazine
Noctes Ambrosianae (1822 to 1835), James Hogg, John Gibson Lockhart, William Maginn, John Wilson et al.
American Writers (1824-1825), John Neal
On Murder Considered as one of the Fine Arts (1827), Thomas De Quincey
The Iron Shroud (1830), William Mudford
The English Mail-Coach (1849), Thomas De Quincey
The Battle of Dorking (1871), George Tomkyns Chesney
The Fixed Period (1881), Anthony Trollope
Youth (1898), Joseph Conrad
Heart of Darkness (1899), Joseph Conrad
Lord Jim (1899), Joseph Conrad
The Highwayman (1906), Alfred Noyes
The Power-House (1913), John Buchan

See also
 How to Write a Blackwood Article, by Edgar Allan Poe

References

Attribution

Further reading 

Oliphant, Margaret, Annals of a Publishing House: William Blackwood and His Sons, Their Magazine and Friends, by Mrs. Oliphant. New York, C. Scribner's Sons, 1897–98. 2 vols.
Porter, Mary Blackwood (Mrs. Gerald Porter), Annals of a Publishing House: John Blackwood, by his Daughter Mrs. Gerald Porter. Edinburgh and London, William Blackwood and Sons, 1898.
Finkelstein, David, The House of Blackwood: Author-Publisher Relations in the Victorian Era, Penn State Press, 2001 

Blackwood's Magazine
 
1804 establishments in Scotland
1980 disestablishments in Scotland
Book publishing companies of Scotland
Companies based in Edinburgh
Defunct companies of Scotland
History of Edinburgh
Magazine publishing companies of Scotland
Printing companies of the United Kingdom
Publishing companies established in 1804
British companies established in 1804
British companies disestablished in 1980